A tribunal, generally, is any person or institution with authority to judge, adjudicate on, or determine claims or disputes—whether or not it is called a tribunal in its title.
For example, an advocate who appears before a court with a single judge could describe that judge as "their tribunal." Many governmental bodies that are titled as "tribunals" are described so in order to emphasize that they are not courts of normal jurisdiction. For example, the International Criminal Tribunal for Rwanda was a body specially constituted under international law; in Great Britain, employment tribunals are bodies set up to hear specific employment disputes. In many (but not all) cases, the word tribunal implies a judicial (or quasi-judicial) body with a lesser degree of formality than a court, in which the normal rules of evidence and procedure may not apply, and whose presiding officers are frequently neither judges, nor magistrates. Private judicial bodies are also often styled "tribunals." The word tribunal, however, is not conclusive of a body's function—for example, in Great Britain, the Employment Appeal Tribunal is a superior court of record.

The term is derived from the tribunes, magistrates of the Classical Roman Republic. "Tribunal" originally referred to the office of the tribunes, and the term is still sometimes used in this sense in historical writings. The tribunal was the platform upon which the presiding authority sat; having a raised position physically as symbolic of his higher position in regard to the adjudication of the law.

By country

Australia
In Australia, the term tribunal generally implies a judicial body with a lesser degree of formality than a court, with a simplified legal procedure, often presided over by a lawyer (solicitor or barrister) who is not a judge or magistrate (often referred to as a member of the tribunal). In many cases the lawyers who function as tribunal members do so only on a part-time basis, and spend the greater part of their time carrying out other aspects of legal practice, such as representing clients. In many cases, the formal rules of evidence which apply in courts do not apply in tribunals, which enables tribunals to hear forms of evidence which courts may not be allowed to consider. Tribunals generally deal with simpler matters; while legal representation is permitted and not uncommon, self-representation is much more common in tribunals than in courts, and tribunal members and registry staff are generally more accustomed to dealing with self-represented parties than courts are. Appeal from a tribunal is to a court.

Tribunals in the Australian judicial system include:
Administrative Appeals Tribunal
Migration Review Tribunal
New South Wales Civil and Administrative Tribunal
Queensland Civil and Administrative Tribunal
State Administrative Tribunal of Western Australia
Victorian Civil and Administrative Tribunal
South Australian Civil and Administration Tribunal

In several Australian states, tribunals function as the equivalent of a small claims court.

In the context of sport, "tribunal" frequently refers to the AFL Tribunal, the disciplinary body of the Australian Football League.

Bangladesh
In Bangladesh, tribunal refers to a court that serves some special purpose, of which Bangladesh has several. These have been set up to ensure speedy trial and reduce case congestion in the normal courts. Beside this, Article 117 of the Constitution of Bangladesh empowers the parliament to set up one or more administrative tribunals. No court can entertain any proceeding or make any order in respect of any matter within the jurisdiction of such tribunal.

Belgium 
In the judicial system of Belgium, the names of the lower trial courts can be translated into English as "tribunals", whilst the higher appellate courts can be translated as "courts".

Brazil 

The Judiciary of Brazil officially names "tribunal" the appeal court and the ones above it, always with more than one judge. The higher court is the Supremo Tribunal Federal (Supreme Federal Court), followed by the superior tribunals (Superior Tribunal de Justiça, Tribunal Superior Eleitoral, Tribunal Superior do Trabalho, Superior Tribunal Militar). The federal justice is divided into regions; each region has its  Tribunal Regional Federal (Regional Federal Court). Also, each state has its own Tribunal de Justiça (Justice Court).

Canada
Civil Resolution Tribunal, an online Tribunal in British Columbia (BC).
Landlord and Tenant Board, formerly the Ontario Rental Housing Tribunal.
Ontario Condominium Authority, facilitates dispute resolution between condo owners and boards regarding issues such as noise complaints.

Hong Kong 
The following tribunals exist within the Judiciary of the Hong Kong Special Administrative Region of the People's Republic of China: Lands, Small Claims, Labour, Obscene Articles. For public inquiries, commissions are set up instead, under the Commissions of Inquiry Ordinance.

India
There are tribunals for settling various administrative and tax-related disputes, including Central Administrative Tribunal, Income Tax Appellate Tribunal, Customs, Excise and Service Tax Appellate Tribunal, National Green Tribunal, Competition Appellate Tribunal and Securities Appellate Tribunal, among others.

The National Company Law Tribunal is a quasi-judicial body in India that adjudicates issues relating to Indian companies.

National Company Law Appellate Tribunal was constituted under Section 410 of the Companies Act, 2013 for hearing appeals against the orders of National Company Law Tribunal, with effect from 1 June 2016.

In several states, Food Safety Appellate Tribunals have been created to hear appeals against orders of adjudicating officers for food safety (additional deputy commissioners).

Armed Forces Tribunal is a military tribunal in India. It was established under the Armed Forces Tribunal Act, 2007.

Permanent Lok Adalat (PUS) is a law court (also known as People's Court) and special tribunal set up in a number of districts throughout the country. It has been established under the Legal Services Authorities Act, 1987.

Ireland

In the Republic of Ireland, tribunal popularly refers to a public inquiry established under the Tribunals of Inquiry (Evidence) Act 1921. The main difference between a Parliamentary Inquiry (non statutory) and a Tribunal of Inquiry in Ireland is that non-statutory inquiries are not vested with the powers, privileges, and rights of the High Court. Tribunals of Inquiry are. Tribunals are established by resolution of the Houses of the Oireachtas to enquire into matters of urgent public importance. It is not a function of Tribunals to administer justice, their work is solely inquisitorial. Tribunals are obliged to report their findings to the Oireachtas. They have the power to enforce the attendance and examination of witnesses and the production of documents relevant to the work in hand. Tribunals can consist of one or more people.  A layperson, or non-lawyer, may be the Sole member of a tribunal.

Netherlands

Historically, in the Netherlands, before the separation of lawmaking, law enforcement, and justice duties, all sentences were delivered by a tribunal of seven schepenen, or magistrates, appointed by the local count. Such a tribunal was called a Vierschaar, so called for a rope—or cord—that was drawn (schaar or scheren) in a four-square dimension, wherein the judges sat on four benches. These benches were positioned in a square as well, with the defendant standing in the middle. Towns had the Vierschaar privilege to hear their own disputes. The Vierschaar was usually located in the town hall, and many historic town halls still have such a room, usually decorated with scenes from the Judgment of Solomon.

United Kingdom

The tribunal system of the United Kingdom is part of the national system of administrative justice. Though it has grown up on an ad hoc basis since the beginning of the twentieth century, from 2007 reforms were put in place to build a unified system with recognised judicial authority, routes of appeal and regulatory supervision.

United States
"Tribunal" is used in the U.S. generally to refer to courts or judicial bodies, as in the ABA Model Rules of Professional Conduct. The Ohio Rules of Professional Conduct, for instance, define "tribunal" as "a court, an arbitrator in a binding arbitration, or a legislative body, administrative agency, or other body acting in an adjudicative capacity."

By sector

Catholic Church

In the Catholic Church, ecclesiastical courts are called tribunals. Tribunals are distinguished by grade, while proceedings are distinguished by instance; for example, an archdiocesan tribunal may hear a cause in first instance if the cause is first brought before the archdiocesan tribunal, or, if the cause was first heard before the diocesan tribunal and is now appealed to the archdiocesan tribunal, the latter may hear the cause in second instance. Only the Roman Rota is competent to hear causes in third instance, with limited exceptions. Other tribunals are incompetent in third instance by reason of grade (ratione gradus), since they do not have the jurisdiction to judge in third instance. Tribunals include:

diocesan or eparchal tribunals (including archdiocesan or archeparchal tribunals)
interdiocesan tribunals, that is, a tribunal erected by the Holy See for more than one diocese, either as a tribunal of first instance, or as an appellate tribunal in second instance
the synod of bishops of patriarchal churches is the highest tribunal within the territory of the patriarchal church, without prejudice to the primacy of the Apostolic See
ordinary tribunal of the patriarchal church, distinct from the eparchial tribunal of the patriarchal church
ordinary tribunals of the Apostolic See
Supreme Tribunal of the Apostolic Signatura, the highest tribunal in the canon law of the Catholic Church
Tribunal of the Roman Rota, the highest appellate tribunal competent in most causes in second and third instance and some causes in first instance
Apostolic Penitentiary, a tribunal for matters concerning the internal forum
Supreme tribunal of the Congregation for the Doctrine of the Faith for certain more grave delicts (canonical crimes)

In health sector
Tribunals also play an integral role in health sectors both within and across nations. Often referred to as "adjunctive tribunals", these quasi-judicial bodies possess regulatory, oversight, and dispute resolution powers to aid in health decision-making and governance. At the same time, the actual effects of adjunctive tribunals on health services are disputed, as little evidence exists to evaluate their efficacy. More empirical evaluations are needed to ensure that tribunals operate in a more evidence-based, systematic manner within the health sector.

See also

Constitutional court
International Criminal Tribunal for the Former Yugoslavia
Iraqi Special Tribunal

Lindsay Tribunal
Nuremberg Trials
Public Inquiry
Revolutionary Tribunal
Revolutionary tribunal (Russia)
State Administrative Tribunal of Western Australia
The Elder Scrolls III: Tribunal  (Morrowind expansion pack)
Tribunal for Local Governments in Kerala
Tribune
Waitangi Tribunal
World Courts of Women
Canadian tribunals

References

 
Courts by type